The diocese of Nha Trang is a Roman Catholic diocese of Vietnam.

The creation of the diocese in present form was declared November 24, 1960.

The diocese covers an area of  9,486 km², and is a suffragan diocese of the Archdiocese of Huế.

By 2013, the diocese of Nha Trang had about 200,385 Catholics (11.2% of the population), 191 priests and 90 parishes.

Christ the King Cathedral in Nha Trang has been assigned as the Cathedral of the diocese.

Ordinaries

Vicar Apostolic
    Paul Raymond-Marie-Marcel Piquet, M.E.P. (5 July 1957 - 24 November 1960)

Bishops
    Paul Raymond-Marie-Marcel Piquet, M.E.P. (24 November 1960 - 3 July 1966)
    François-Xavier Nguyên Van Thuận (13 April 1967 - 24 April 1975)
    Paul Nguyên Van Hòa (25 April 1975 - 4 December 2009)
    Joseph Võ Đức Minh (4 December 2009 – 23 July 2022)

References

External links
Official web-site of Diocese of Nha Trang

Nha Trang
Nha Trang
Christian organizations established in 1960
Roman Catholic dioceses and prelatures established in the 20th century
Nha Trang, Roman Catholic Diocese of
1960 establishments in South Vietnam